Reprocessing may refer to:

 Nuclear reprocessing
 Recycling